Everett Evans Newcomb (November 16, 1895 – March 19, 1985) was a Canadian politician. He served in the Legislative Assembly of New Brunswick as member of the Progressive Conservative party from 1952 to 1967.

References

1895 births
1985 deaths